Fürth Rathaus station is a Nuremberg U-Bahn station located in Fürth, run by the line U1.

Rathaus, meaning town hall in German, is the U-Bahn station for Fürth's town hall (not that of Nuremberg).

This station features a painting on the wall, representing the whole inner city of Fürth. The station is a central hub for public transport. Here, 
change for city bus lines 173, 174, 175, 177, 178, 179, as well as regional bus lines 124 and 125 is possible.

Also, the station is the fourth U-Bahn station within Fürth, when coming from Nuremberg.

References

Nuremberg U-Bahn stations
Railway stations in Germany opened in 1998
Buildings and structures completed in 1998